This list contains Germanic elements of the English language which have a close corresponding Latinate form.  The correspondence is semantic—in most cases these words are not cognates, but in some cases they are doublets, i.e., ultimately derived from the same root, generally Proto-Indo-European, as in cow and beef, both ultimately from PIE *gʷōus.

The meanings of these words do not always correspond to Germanic cognates, and occasionally the specific meaning in the list is unique to English.

Those Germanic words listed below with a Frankish source mostly came into English through Anglo-Norman, and so despite ultimately deriving from Proto-Germanic, came to English through a Romance language (and many have cognates in modern Romance languages).  This results in some Germanic doublets, such as yard and garden, through Anglo-Saxon and Anglo-Norman respectively.

List of Germanic and Latinate equivalents in English

* reconstructed form

Noun/adjective doublets
In particular, the use of Latinate words in the sciences gives us pairs with a native Germanic noun and a Latinate (or Ancient Greek-derived) adjective:
animals: ant/formic, bee/apian, bird/avian, crow/corvine,  cod/gadoid, carp/cyprine, fish/piscine, mew/larine, wasp/vespine, butterfly/papilionaceous, worm/vermian, spider/arachnid, snake/anguine, mouse (or rat)/murine, cat/feline, rabbit/cunicular, hare/leporine, dog/canine, deer/cervine, reindeer/rangiferine, fox/vulpine, wolf/lupine, goat/caprine, sheep/ovine, swan/cygnine or cygnean, duck/anatine, starling/sturnine, goose/anserine, horse/equine, chicken/gallinaceous, cow/bovine, pig/porcine, whale/cetacean, ape/simian,  bear/ursine, man/human or hominid (gender specific: man/masculine, woman/feminine).
physiology: head/capital, ear/aural, tooth/dental, tongue/lingual, lips/labial, neck/cervical, finger/digital, hand/manual, arm/brachial, foot/pedal, sole of the foot/plantar, leg/crural, eye/ocular or visual, mouth/oral, chest/pectoral, nipple/papillary, brain/cerebral, mind/mental, nail/ungual, hair/pilar, heart/cardial, lung/pulmonary, bone/osteotic, liver/hepatic, kidney/renal, blood/sanguine.
astronomy: moon/lunar, sun/solar, earth/terrestrial, star/stellar.
sociology: son or daughter/filial, mother/maternal, father/paternal, brother/fraternal, sister/sororal, wife/uxorial.
other: book/literary, edge/marginal, earl/comital, fire/igneous, water/aquatic, wind/vental, ice/glacial, boat/naval, house/domestic, door/portal, town/urban, light/optical, sight/visual, tree/arboreal, marsh/paludal, sword/gladiate, king/regal, fighter/military, bell/tintinnabulary.

See also
Collateral adjective
List of collateral adjectives (Wiktionary)
Lists of English loanwords by country or language of origin
List of English words with dual French and Anglo-Saxon variations
List of English words of French origin
List of English Latinates of Germanic origin
Latin influence in English
Changes to Old English vocabulary
Anglish

Sources
Online Etymology Dictionary
Merriam-Webster Online
Dictionary of Etymology: the Origins of American English Words.  Robert K. Barnhart. 

History of the English language
Lists of etymologies
Lists of English words of foreign origin
English
Latin language